Edi Subaktiar (born 13 January 1994) is an Indonesian former badminton player specializing in doubles. He was the 2012 World Junior mixed doubles champion partnered with Melati Daeva Oktaviani. In the international competition, he was paired with Gloria Emanuelle Widjaja in mixed doubles and with Ronald Alexander in men's doubles. Since 2008, he joined PB. Djarum, a badminton club in Kudus, Central Java where his pair in mixed doubles Widjaja also joined. He retired in 2019 after a long injury which had prevented him to play again since it occurred at the 2017 Southeast Asian Games.

Personal life 
After leaving national training centre in 2019, Subaktiar was then assigned by Djarum club to become a coach in Champion club in Magelang.

Achievements

BWF World Junior Championships 
Mixed doubles

Asian Junior Championships 
Boys' doubles

BWF Grand Prix (1 title, 2 runners-up) 
The BWF Grand Prix had two levels, the BWF Grand Prix and Grand Prix Gold. It was a series of badminton tournaments sanctioned by the Badminton World Federation (BWF) which was held from 2007 to 2017.

Mixed doubles

  BWF Grand Prix Gold tournament
  BWF Grand Prix tournament

BWF International Challenge/Series 
Men's doubles

Mixed doubles

  BWF International Challenge tournament
  BWF International Series tournament

Performance timeline

National team 
 Junior level

 Senior level

Individual competitions 
 Junior level

 Senior level

Record against selected opponents 
Mixed doubles results with Gloria Emanuelle Widjaja against Superseries Final finalists, World Championships semifinalists, and Olympic quarterfinalists.

  Liu Cheng & Bao Yixin 0–2
  Lu Kai & Huang Yaqiong 0–2
  Wang Yilyu & Tang Yuanting 1–0
  Zhang Nan & Zhao Yunlei 0–1
  Chen Hung-ling & Wu Ti-jung 0–1
  Tseng Min-hao & Cheng Wen-hsing 0–1
  Chris Adcock & Gabby Adcock 1–1
  Michael Fuchs & Birgit Michels 0–1
  Reginald Lee Chun Hei & Chau Hoi Wah 1–0
  Muhammad Rijal & Vita Marissa 0–1
  Riky Widianto & Richi Puspita Dili 0–1
  Ko Sung-hyun & Kim Ha-na 0–3
  Yoo Yeon-seong & Chang Ye-na 1–0

References

External links 
 
 

1994 births
Living people
People from Sidoarjo Regency
Sportspeople from East Java
Indonesian male badminton players
Competitors at the 2017 Southeast Asian Games
Southeast Asian Games gold medalists for Indonesia
Southeast Asian Games medalists in badminton